The 39th Annual Annie Awards honoring the best in animation of 2011 were held on February 4, 2012, at Royce Hall in Los Angeles, California.

Production nominees
Nominations announced on December 5, 2011

Best Animated Feature
Rango - Paramount/Nickelodeon Movies, Blind Wink, GK Films
 A Cat in Paris – Folimage
 Wrinkles – Perro Verde Films, S.L.
 Arthur Christmas – Columbia/Sony Pictures Animation, Aardman Animations
 Cars 2 – Disney/Pixar
 Chico & Rita – Chico & Rita Distribution Limited
 Kung Fu Panda 2 - DreamWorks Animation
 Puss in Boots - DreamWorks Animation
 Rio - 20th Century Fox/Blue Sky Studios
 The Adventures of Tintin - Paramount, Columbia/Amblin Entertainment, The Kennedy/Marshall Company, Nickelodeon Movies, WingNut Films

Best Animated Special Production
Kung Fu Panda: Secrets of the Masters - DreamWorks Animation
 Adventure Time: Thank You - Cartoon Network Studios
 Batman: Year One - Warner Bros. Animation
 Ice Age: A Mammoth Christmas - Blue Sky Studios
 Prey 2 - Blur Studio
 Star Tours - Industrial Light & Magic

Best Animated Short Subject
Adam and Dog – Lodge Films
 I Tawt I Taw A Puddy Tat – Warner Bros. Animation
 La Luna – Pixar
 (Notes on) Biology – Ornana
 Paths of Hate – Platige Image
 Sunday – National Film Board of Canada
 The Ballad of Nessie –Walt Disney Animation Studios
 The Girl and the Fox – Base14
 Wild Life – National Film Board of Canada and Studio GDS

Best Animated Television Commercial
Twinings "Sea" – Psyop
 Audi "Hummingbird" - The Mill
 Geico "Foghorn" – Renegade Animation
 McDonald's "Apple Tree" – Duck Studios/Kompost
 McDonald's "Suzi Van Zoom" – Duck Studios/Kompost
 Norton "Stuff" – Psyop
 O2 "Niggles & Narks" – The Mill
 Statoil "Good Night" – Studio AKA
 "The Pirate" – Meindbender

Best General Audience Animated TV Production
The Simpsons - Gracie Films
 Archer - FX Productions
 Green Lantern: The Animated Series - Warner Bros. Animation
 Hoops & YoYo Ruin Christmas - Hallmark
 Mad - Warner Bros. Animation
 Mary Shelley's Frankenhole Season 2 - Starburns Industries, Inc
 Prep & Landing: Naughty vs. Nice - Walt Disney Animation Studios
 Star Wars: The Clone Wars - Lucasfilm Animation, Ltd.

Best Animated Television Production - Preschool
Jake and the Never Land Pirates – Disney Television Animation
 Chuggington – Ludorum plc
 Mickey Mouse Clubhouse – Disney Television Animation
 The WotWots Season 2 – Pūkeko Pictures

Best Animated Television Production – Children
The Amazing World of Gumball – Cartoon Network in Association with Dandelion Studios, Boulder Media & Studio Soi
 Fanboy & Chum Chum – Nickelodeon and Frederator
 Kung Fu Panda: Legends of Awesomeness – Nickelodeon and DreamWorks Animation
 The Penguins of Madagascar – Nickelodeon and DreamWorks Animation

Best Animated Video Game
Insanely Twisted Shadow Planet – Shadow Planet Productions, Gagne/Fuelcell
 Bumpy Road – Simogo
 Catherine – Atlus
 Gears of War 3 – Epic Games
 Gesundheit! – Konami Digital Entertainment
 Ghost Trick: Phantom Detective – Capcom
 Ratchet & Clank: All 4 One – Insomniac Games
 Rayman Origins – Ubisoft Montpellier
 Uncharted 3: Drake's Deception – Naughty Dog

Individual Achievement Categories

Animated Effects in an Animated Production
Kevin Romond - The Adventures of Tintin: The Secret of the Unicorn - Amblin Entertainment, Wingnut Films and The Kennedy/Marshall Company
 Can Yuksel - Puss in Boots - DreamWorks Animation
 Chase Cooper - Rango - Industrial Light & Magic
 Dan Lund - Winnie the Pooh - Walt Disney Animation Studios
 Dave Tidgwell - Kung Fu Panda 2 - DreamWorks Animation
 Eric Froemling - Cars 2 - Pixar
 Jason Mayer - Kung Fu Panda 2 - DreamWorks Animation
 Joel Aron - Star Wars: The Clone Wars - Lucasfilm Animation, Ltd.
 Jon Reisch - Cars 2 - Pixar
 Willi Geiger - Rango - Industrial Light & Magic

Animated Effects in a Live Action Production
Florent Andorra - Transformers: Dark of the Moon - Industrial Light & Magic
 Branko Grujcic - Pirates of the Caribbean: On Stranger Tides - Industrial Light & Magic
 Gary Wu - Cowboys & Aliens - Industrial Light & Magic
 Lee Uren - Cowboys & Aliens - Industrial Light & Magic

Character Animation in a Television Production
Tony Smeed - Prep & Landing: Naughty vs. Nice - Walt Disney Animation Studios
 Chad Sellers - Prep & Landing: Naughty vs. Nice - Walt Disney Animation Studios
 Michael Franceschi - Kung Fu Panda: Legends of Awesomeness - Nickelodeon and DreamWorks Animation
 Rebecca Wilson Bresee - Prep & Landing: Naughty vs. Nice - Walt Disney Animation Studios
 Sihanouk Mariona - Mary Shelley's Frankenhole Season 2 - Starburns Industries, Inc.

Character Animation in a Feature Production
Jeff Gabor - Rio - Blue Sky Studios
 Andreas Deja - Winnie the Pooh - Walt Disney Animation Studios
 Dan Wagner - Kung Fu Panda 2 - DreamWorks Animation
 Mark Henn - Winnie the Pooh - Walt Disney Animation Studios
 Olivier Staphylas - Puss in Boots - DreamWorks Animation
 Patrik Puhala - Rio - Blue Sky Studios
 Pierre Perifel - Kung Fu Panda 2 - DreamWorks Animation

Character Animation in a Live Action Production
Eric Reynolds - Rise of the Planet of the Apes - 20th Century Fox
 Andy Arnett - Hop - Rhythm & Hues, Illumination Entertainment
 David Lowry - Paul - Double Negative Visual Effects for Universal Productions/ Relativity Media/Working Title Films/Big Talk Productions
 Mike Hull - Paul - Double Negative Visual Effects for Universal Productions/ Relativity Media/Working Title Films/Big Talk Productions

Character Design in a Television Production
Bill Schwab - Prep & Landing: Naughty vs. Nice – Walt Disney Animation Studios
 Carl Raggio Kick Buttowski – Disney Television Animation
 Chad Hurd Archer – FX Productions
 Chris Battle Dan Vs. – Starz Film Roman
 Eric Robles Fanboy & Chum Chum – Nickelodeon & Frederator
 Gordon Hammond T.U.F.F. Puppy – Nickelodeon
 Mike Dougherty T.U.F.F. Puppy – Nickelodeon
 Robert Ryan Cory Secret Mountain Fort Awesome – Cartoon Network Studios

Character Design in a Feature Production
Mark "Crash" McCreery - Rango – Paramount Pictures and Nickelodeon Movies Blind Wink/GK films Productions
 Jay Shuster - Cars 2 – Pixar
 Patrick Mate - Puss in Boots – DreamWorks Animation
 Peter de Seve - Arthur Christmas – Sony Pictures Animation, Aardman Animations
 Sergio Pablos - Rio – Blue Sky Studios

Directing in a Television Production
Matthew Nastuk - The Simpsons – Gracie Films
 Brian Sheesley - Dan Vs. – Starz Film Roman
 Chris Savino & Clay Morrow - Kick Buttowski – Disney Television Animation
 Dan Riba - Ben 10: Ultimate Alien – Cartoon Network Studios
 Duke Johnson - Community – 23 D Films, Inc.
 Gabe Swarr - Kung Fu Panda: Legends of Awesomeness – Nickelodeon and DreamWorks Animation
 Ken Bruce - T.U.F.F. Puppy – Nickelodeon
 Kevin Deters & Stevie Wermers-Skelton - Prep & Landing: Naughty vs. Nice – Walt Disney Animation Studios
 Mic Graves & Ben Bocquelet - The Amazing World of Gumball – Cartoon Network Europe in association with Dandelion Studios, Boulder Media & Studio Soi
 Peter Hausner - Ninjago: Masters of Spinjitzu – Wil Film
 Steve Loter, Christo Stamboliev, Shaun Cashman, David Knott - The Penguins of Madagascar – Nickelodeon and Technicolor
 Tony Craig - Hoops & YoYo Ruin Christmas – Hallmark

Directing in a Feature Production
Jennifer Yuh Nelson - Kung Fu Panda 2 – DreamWorks Animation
 Carlos Saldanha - Rio – Blue Sky Studios
 Chris Miller Puss in Boots – DreamWorks Animation
 Don Hall & Stephen J. Anderson - Winnie the Pooh – Walt Disney Animation Studios
 Gore Verbinski - Rango – Paramount Pictures and Nickelodeon Movies, Blind Wink/GK films Productions
 Kelly Asbury - Gnomeo & Juliet – Touchstone Pictures

Music in a Television Production
Grace Potter, Michael Giacchino - Prep & Landing: Naughty vs. Nice – Walt Disney Animation Studios
 Adam Berry, Bob Schooley, Mark McCorkle - The Penguins of Madagascar – Nickelodeon and DreamWorks Animation
 Ben Locket - The Amazing World of Gumball – Cartoon Network Europe in association with Dandelion Studios, Boulder Media & Studio Soi
 Frederik Wiedmann - Green Lantern: The Animated Series – Warner Bros. Animation
 Joel McNeely, Brendan Milburn and Valerie Vigoda - Pixie Hollow Games – DisneyToon Studios
 Kevin Kliesch - Thundercats – Warner Bros. Animation and Cartoon Network
 Shawn Patterson, Zeb Wells - Robot Chicken – ShadowMachine and Stoopid Monkey in association with Adult Swim

Music in a Feature Production
John Williams - The Adventures of Tintin – Amblin Entertainment, Wingnut Films and The Kennedy/Marshall Company
 Henry Jackman - Puss in Boots – DreamWorks Animation
 Mikael Mutti, Siedah Garrett, Carlinhos Brown, Sergio Mendes, John Powell - Rio – Blue Sky Studios
 Zooey Deschanel, Kristen Anderson-Lopez, Henry Jackman, Robert Lopez - Winnie The Pooh – Walt Disney Animation Studios

Production Design in a Television Production
Mark Bodnar, Chris Tsirgiotis, Sue Mondt and Daniel Elson – Secret Mountain Fort Awesome – Cartoon Network Studios
 Peter Martin Hoops & YoYo Ruin Christmas – Hallmark

Production Design in a Feature Production
Raymond Zilbach - Kung Fu Panda 2 – DreamWorks Animation
 Harley Jessup - Cars 2 – Pixar
 Paul Felix - Winnie the Pooh – Walt Disney Animation Studios
 Thomas Cardone, Kyle MacNaughton & Peter Chan Rio – Blue Sky Studios

Storyboarding in a Television Production
Brian Kesinger – Prep & Landing: Naughty vs. Nice – Walt Disney Animation Studios
 Barry W. Johnson Prep & Landing: Naughty vs. Nice – Walt Disney Animation Studios
 Benton Connor Regular Show – Cartoon Network Studios
 Dave Thomas T.U.F.F. Puppy – Nickelodeon
 Fred Gonzalez T.U.F.F. Puppy – Nickelodeon
 Joe Mateo Prep & Landing: Naughty vs. Nice – Walt Disney Animation Studios
 Justin Nichols Fanboy & Chum Chum – Nickelodeon & Frederator
 Katie Rice Fanboy & Chum Chum – Nickelodeon & Frederator
 Rebecca Sugar Adventure Time – Cartoon Network Studios

Storyboarding in a Feature Production
Jeremy Spears - Winnie the Pooh – Walt Disney Animation Studios
 Bob Logan - Puss in Boots – DreamWorks Animation
 Delia Gosman - Rango – Paramount Pictures & Nickelodeon Movies present A Blind Wink/GK Films Production
 Gary Graham - Kung Fu Panda 2 – DreamWorks Animation
 Josh Hayes - Rango – Paramount Pictures & Nickelodeon Movies present A Blind Wink/GK Films Production
 Kris Pearn - Arthur Christmas – Sony Pictures Animation, Aardman Animations
 Nelson Yokota - Gnomeo & Juliet – Touchstone Pictures
 Philip Craven - Kung Fu Panda 2 – DreamWorks Animation
 Scott Morse - Cars 2 – Pixar

Voice Acting in a Television Production
Jeff Bennett as Kowalski - The Penguins of Madagascar – Nickelodeon and DreamWorks Animation
 Carlos Alazraqui as Denzel Crocker - Fairly OddParents – Nickelodeon
 Dan Harmon as Jekyll - Mary Shelley's Frankenhole Season 2 – Starburns Industries, Inc.
 Daran Norris as Cosmo - Fairly OddParents – Nickelodeon
 Dee Bradley Baker as Clone Troopers - Star Wars: The Clone Wars – Lucasfilm Animation, Ltd.
 Diedrich Bader as Batman - Batman: The Brave and the Bold – Warner Bros. Animation
 H. Jon Benjamin as Sterling Archer - Archer – FX Productions
 Jeff B. Davis as Victor Frankenstein - Mary Shelley's Frankenhole Season 2 – Starburns Industries, Inc.
 Jessica Walter as Malory Archer - Archer – FX Productions
 Judy Greer as Cheryl Tunt - Archer – FX Productions
 Logan Grove as Gumball - The Amazing World of Gumball – Cartoon Network Europe in association with Dandelion Studios, Boulder Media & Studio Soi
 Nika Futterman as Asajj Ventress - Star Wars: The Clone Wars – Lucasfilm Animation, Ltd.
 Scott Adsit as the Creature - Mary Shelley's Frankenhole Season 2 – Starburns Industries, Inc.
 Tara Strong as Timmy Turner - Fairly OddParents – Nickelodeon

Voice Acting in a Feature Production
Bill Nighy as Grandsanta - Arthur Christmas – Sony Pictures Animation, Aardman Animations
 Ashley Jensen as Bryony - Arthur Christmas – Sony Pictures Animation, Aardman Animations
 Gary Oldman as Shen - Kung Fu Panda 2 – DreamWorks Animation
 James Hong as Mr. Ping - Kung Fu Panda 2 DreamWorks Animation
 Jemaine Clement as Nigel - Rio – Blue Sky Studios
 Jim Cummings as Featherstone - Gnomeo & Juliet – Touchstone Pictures
 Zach Galifianakis as Humpty Alexander Dumpty - Puss in Boots – DreamWorks Animation

Best Writing in an Animated Television Production
Carolyn Omine – The Simpsons - "Treehouse of Horror XXII" – Gracie Films
 Blake Lemons, William Reiss, C.H. Greenblatt, Derek Evanick, Diana Lafyatis, Neil Graf Disney Fish Hooks – Fish School Musical – Disney Television Animation
 Dani Michaeli, Sean Charmatz, Nate Cash, Luke Brookshier, Paul Tibbitt SpongeBob SquarePants - "Patrick's Staycation" – Nickelodeon
 Josh Weinstein Futurama - "All the Presidents' Heads" – The Curiosity Company in association with 20th Century Fox Television
 Ray DeLaurentis, Will Schifrin, Kevin Sullivan T.U.F.F. Puppy – "Thunder Dog" – Nickelodeon
 Matt Maiellaro, Dave Willis Aqua Unit Patrol Squad 1 – "The Creditor" – Williams Street Studios, Adult Swim
 Ray DeLaurentis, Will Schifrin, Kevin Sullivan The Fairly OddParents – "Invasion of the Dads" – Nickelodeon
 Steve Wermers-Skelton, Kevin Deters Prep & Landing: Naughty vs. Nice – Walt Disney Animation Studios

Writing in a Feature Production
John Logan, Gore Verbinski and James Byrkit – Rango – Paramount Pictures and Nickelodeon Movies present A Blind Wink/GK Films Productions
 Andy Riley, Kevin Cecil, Mark Burton, Kathy Greenberg, Emily Cook, Rob Sprackling, John R. Smith, Kelly Asbury, Steve Hamilton Shaw Gnomeo & Juliet – Touchstone Pictures
 Brian Kesinger, Kendelle Hoyer, Don Dougherty, Clio Chiang, Don Hall, Stephen Anderson, Nicole Mitchell, Jeremy Spears Winnie the Pooh – Walt Disney Animation Studios
 Sarah Smith, Peter Baynham Arthur Christmas – Sony Pictures Animation, Aardman Animations
 Steve Moffat, Edgar Wright, Joe Cronish The Adventures of Tintin: The Secret of the Unicorn– Amblin Entertainment, Wingnut Films, and Kennedy/Marshall

Editing in Television Production
Ted Machold, Jeff Adams, Doug Tiano, Bob Tomlin – Penguins of Madagascar – Nickelodeon and DreamWorks Animation
 Garret Elkins Mary Shelley's Frankenhole Season 2 – Starburn Industries, Inc.
 Hugo Morales, Davrick Waltjen, Adam Arnold, and Otto Ferrene Kung Fu Panda Nickelodeon and DreamWorks Animation
 Jason W.A. Tucker Star Wars: The Clone Wars – Lucasfilm Animation, Ltd.
 Paul D. Calder Futurama – The Curiosity Company in association with 20th Century Fox Television

Editing in a Feature Production
Craig Wood, A.C.E. – Rango – Paramount Pictures and Nickelodeon Movies present A Blind Wink/GK Films Production
 Clare Knight, A.C.E. Kung Fu Panda 2 – DreamWorks Animation
 Eric Dapkewicz Puss in Boots – DreamWorks Animation
 Michael Kahn The Adventures of Tintin: The Secret of the Unicorn– Amblin Entertainment, Wingnut Films and Kennedy/Marshall
 Stephen Schaffer, A.C.E. Cars 2 – Pixar

Juried awards

Winsor McCay Award Walt Peregoy, Borge Ring, and Ronald Searle

June Foray Art Leonardi

Special Achievement Depth Analysis

References

External links
 Complete list of 39th Annual Annie Awards nominees and winners

2011
2011 film awards
Annie
Annie